Marian Lazăr (born 14 October 1952) is a Romanian boxer. He competed in the men's bantamweight event at the 1972 Summer Olympics.

References

1952 births
Living people
Romanian male boxers
Olympic boxers of Romania
Boxers at the 1972 Summer Olympics
People from Medgidia
Bantamweight boxers